The  is located in Arita Town, Nishimatsuura District, Saga Prefecture. Sueyama Shrine has a porcelain archway and other items of porcelain which, at other shrines, are usually made of stone. This shrine was and still is particularly revered by Arita’s ceramists.

History 
It is dedicated to Emperor Ōjin, Nabeshima Naoshige, and Yi Sam-pyeong. It was founded in 1658. 

The torii (a Shinto shrine archway), built in 1888, had been designated Tangible Cultural Properties on April 28, 2000.

Yi Sam-pyeong Monument

The Yi Sam-pyeong Monument was built in 1917 to commemorate the 300th anniversary of Arita's porcelain. It is on a hill, from which one can view Arita town.

External links
Sueyama Shrine Website 

Shinto shrines in Saga Prefecture
Hachiman shrines
Religious buildings and structures completed in 1658